Hills Showground railway station is an underground rapid transit station built by the Metro Trains Sydney consortium at Doran Drive, Castle Hill, in Sydney, Australia. The station, located near the Castle Hill Showground, was built as part of Transport for NSW's Sydney Metro Northwest project, to serve future train services to Rouse Hill and Chatswood. The station is planned to eventually serve trains to the Sydney central business district and Bankstown as part of the government's 20-year Sydney's Rail Future strategy. The station opened 26 May 2019.

History

The original plans for the North West Rail Link showed a station called Hills Centre, after the complex of civic buildings of the same name. This was to have been constructed on the site of the Castle Hill Showground. Following community consultation, it was determined that the station would be moved to the Hills Centre site – requiring its demolition – in order to retain the Showground. The station was renamed as a result.

Services

Hills Showground has two platforms. It is served by Metro North West Line services. Hills Showground station is served by a number of bus routes operated by Busways and Hillsbus.

References

External links
 Hills Showground Station description at Sydney Metro Northwest project website
 Northwest Rapid Transit corporate website
 Hills Showground Station details Transport for New South Wales  (Archived 17 June 2019)

Easy Access railway stations in Sydney
Railway stations in Australia opened in 2019
Sydney Metro stations
Castle Hill, New South Wales
The Hills Shire